Julián Bartolo (born 15 April 1996) is an Argentine professional footballer who plays as a winger for Greek Super League club Asteras Tripolis.

Career
Bartolo played in the youth set-up of Lanús, a team he represented at the 2016 U-20 Copa Libertadores in Paraguay. On 6 September 2017, Bartolo departed the Primera División club to move to Primera B Metropolitana's San Miguel. Villa San Carlos were the opponents for his professional bow, with the midfielder featuring for the final twenty minutes of a 2–0 victory on 26 September. He was selected in a total of nineteen matches during 2017–18, a campaign in which he scored his first senior goal in against Fénix in December. July 2018 saw Bartolo join Guillermo Brown of Primera B Nacional.

On 7 August 2020, after a season back in the third tier with Acassuso, Bartolo joined Superleague Greece outfit Volos on a free transfer. He scored his first goal in stoppage time of a 1–1 draw away to Panathinaikos on 24 October. On 30 November, Bartolo scored in a 3–3 away draw against Apollon Smyrnis; his side were three goals down early in the second half, with the midfielder netting the second and assisting the equaliser for fellow Argentine player Rodrigo Colombo, having been substituted on at 3–1 in place of other compatriot Nicolás Martínez.

In the first two games of the 2021–22 season, Bartolo scored helping to wins against Lamia and Apollon Smyrnis and a perfect start, which found his team on top of the league table. On 17 October 2021, Bartolo scored a goal and assisted Tom van Weert in a spectacular 4–4 away draw against PAOK, despite his team being down by three goals in the first half.

On 1 July 2022, Bartolo signed a three-year contract with Asteras Tripolis, also in the top tier.

Career statistics
.

References

External links

1996 births
Living people
People from Quilmes
Argentine footballers
Association football midfielders
Argentine expatriate footballers
Expatriate footballers in Greece
Argentine expatriate sportspeople in Greece
Primera B Metropolitana players
Primera Nacional players
Super League Greece players
Club Atlético San Miguel footballers
Guillermo Brown footballers
Club Atlético Acassuso footballers
Volos N.F.C. players
Asteras Tripolis F.C. players
Sportspeople from Buenos Aires Province